Urmilesh was the executive director of Rajya Sabha TV from 2010 to 2012, and has worked in various Hindi publications like Hindustan and Navbharat Times, among others. He also anchored  Media Manthan on Rajya Sabha TV, a media-watch programme about the week's news and its coverage in the media.

He is currently (as of July 2020) the 'Reader's Editor' at newsclick.in.

Urmilesh completed his M.A. from Allahabad University and received his MPhil from JNU in 1981.

He has written Hindi books like Christiania Meri Jaan, Kashmir - Virasat aur Siyasat (2006), Jharkhand Jadui Zameen Ka Andhera, Bihar ka Sach, Rahul Sankrityayan Srijan Aur Sangharsh, Jhelam Kinare Dahakate Chinar.

References 

Hindi journalists
Hindi-language writers
Indian male television journalists
Indian broadcast news analysts
Journalists from Delhi
Jawaharlal Nehru University alumni
University of Allahabad alumni
People from Ghazipur